Beach wrestling competition at the 2016 Asian Beach Games was held in Danang, Vietnam from 30 September to 2 October 2016 at Bien Dong Park.

Medalists

Men

Women

Medal table

Results

Men

60 kg
1 October

70 kg
1 October

80 kg
2 October

90 kg
2 October

Pools

Final

Women

50 kg
30 September

Pools

Final

60 kg
30 September

Pools

Final

70 kg
30 September

+70 kg
1 October

References

External links 
Official website

2016 Asian Beach Games events
Asian Beach Games
2016
International wrestling competitions hosted by Thailand